Mangueira (Mango Tree) is a shantytown neighborhood (favela) in the city of Rio de Janeiro, Brazil, centered on the Mangueira hill or morro. It is most famous for its samba school, the Grêmio Recreativo Escola de Samba Estação Primeira de Mangueira, called for short Estação Primeira de Mangueira (First Mangueira [train] Station) or simply Mangueira, which is one of strongest competitors in the annual Rio Carnival samba competition.

Neighbourhoods in Rio de Janeiro (city)
Favelas